Glenn Martin may refer to:

 Glenn Martin (coach) (1906–1997), American football, basketball, and baseball coach
 Glenn E. Martin, American criminal justice reform advocate 
 Glenn L. Martin (1886–1955), American aviation pioneer
 Glenn Martin (judge) (born 1955), justice of the Supreme Court of Queensland
 Glenn N. Martin, New Zealand aviation pioneer, inventor of the Martin Jetpack  
 Glenn Martin, DDS, an American stop-motion-animated television series

See also
Glen Martin (disambiguation)

Martin, Glenn